Lauren Emily Iungerich (born September 14, 1974) is a writer, director and showrunner known for Awkward.

Early life 
Iungerich was born in Los Angeles, California to social worker mother, Viola Iungerich (née Dube), and attorney father, Russell Iungerich. She grew up in Rancho Palos Verdes, California, graduating from Palos Verdes Peninsula High School in 1992 and from Claremont McKenna College in 1996.  The Palos Verdes area was the setting of Awkward.

Career 
At the end of her junior year of college Iungerich began interning for Hollywood producers. She worked as an assistant to producer Arnold Kopelson on U.S. Marshals and A Perfect Murder, and worked in production. She wrote scripts for TV show pilots and had a film script optioned by Icon Productions. She was hired to the writing staff of ABC Family's 10 Things I Hate About You based on her play Love on the Line.

She has created some web content, My Two Fans, which she describes as being inspired by Curb Your Enthusiasm.

Iungerich created the MTV sitcom Awkward. She left the show after season three. That year she won the People's Choice Award for "Favorite Cable Comedy". Since 2018 she has been the director, producer, and writer for the popular Netflix show On My Block.

Iungerich has an upcoming project called Couch Detective, an ABC hour long comedic mystery via Jerry Bruckheimer TV and Warner Bros. Television. Another upcoming project is called Tough Cookie, and is set up at ABC Family and will be a single camera comedy.

Filmography 
 2018–2021: On My Block - Co-creator, Executive Producer, Director, Writer
 2014: Damaged Goods (TV movie) – Executive Producer, Writer
 2013: Awkward – Executive Producer (47 episodes); Writer (21 episodes); Director (11 episodes)
 2013: Hot Mess (TV movie) – Executive Producer, Director, Writer
 2013: Dumb Girls (TV movie) – Executive Producer, Writer
 2009: 10 Things I Hate About You – Writer (1 episode "Don't Give Up")
 2009: My Two Fans (Web series) – Producer, Director, Writer
 1998: A Perfect Murder – Producer's Assistant
 1998: U.S. Marshals – Producer's Assistant

Personal life 
Iungerich married music supervisor Jamie Dooner in 2012. They reside in Southern California with their two children Charlie and Fletcher.

References

External links 
 
 

Living people
1974 births

21st-century American screenwriters
21st-century American women writers
American television writers
American women screenwriters
American women television producers
American women television writers
Claremont McKenna College alumni
People from Rancho Palos Verdes, California
Screenwriters from California
Showrunners
Television producers from California
Writers from Los Angeles